"Round Here" is a song recorded by American country music duo Florida Georgia Line. It was released in June 2013 as the third single from their album Here's to the Good Times. It was written by Rodney Clawson, Chris Tompkins, and Thomas Rhett.

Composition
According to the sheet music published at musicnotes.com, the song is written in the key of D-flat major.

Music video
The music video was directed by Peter Zavadil and premiered in June 2013. It was filmed in the duo's hometowns, Ormond Beach, Florida and Monroe, Georgia.

Commercial performance
"Round Here" debuted at number 54 on the U.S. Billboard Country Airplay chart for the week of June 1, 2013. It debuted at number 36 on the U.S. Billboard Hot Country Songs chart for the week of December 22, 2012. It also debuted at number 89 on the U.S. Billboard Hot 100 and number 90 on the Canadian Hot 100 for the week of June 29, 2013. As of April 2014, the song has sold 1,143,000 copies in the US.  The song was certified double Platinum by the RIAA in 2015 and triple Platinum in 2019.

The song became the duo's third consecutive number 1 on the Country Airplay chart dated for September 21, 2013, thus making Florida Georgia Line only the second duo after Brooks & Dunn to send its first three singles to number 1 on that chart. During its first week at the top of the charts, the Top 10 of Country Airplay included five songs co-written by Thomas Rhett or his father, Rhett Akins, one of which was the former's own "It Goes Like This". On The November 18th episode of Raw the duo performed the song.

Charts and certifications

Weekly chart

Year-end charts

Certifications

References

2013 singles
2012 songs
Florida Georgia Line songs
Republic Records singles
Songs written by Rodney Clawson
Songs written by Chris Tompkins
Songs written by Thomas Rhett
Music videos directed by Peter Zavadil
Republic Nashville singles
Song recordings produced by Joey Moi